This is a list of second-tier open-wheel single-seater formula racing motorsport champions, including Formula 2, Formula 3000, and GP2. Since 1967 there have been at least five second-tier championships sanctioned by the FIA. Additionally, various regional and national second-tier championships have existed and still exist.

Only fifteen second-tier champions have ever won a Formula One grand prix. Only two have become Formula One World Drivers' Champions, namely Nico Rosberg (once) and Lewis Hamilton (seven times). Ten second-tier champions have never raced in Formula One at all, although Vincenzo Sospiri was entered in a single Grand Prix.

European Formula Two Championship 
The European Formula Two Championship was a Formula Two motor racing series that was held between 1967–84. The races were held across Europe, and were contested both by drivers aiming to compete in Formula One in the future as well as current Formula One drivers wishing to practice. The series was sanctioned by the FIA, motorsports world governing body.

Drivers in italic have raced in Formula One; drivers in bold have won at least one Formula One Grand Prix.

International Formula 3000 Championship 
The Formula 3000 International Championship was a motor racing series created by the Fédération Internationale de l'Automobile (FIA) in 1985 to become the final preparatory step for drivers hoping to enter Formula One. Formula Two had become too expensive, and was dominated by works-run cars with factory engines; the hope was that Formula 3000 would offer quicker, cheaper, more open racing. The series began as an open specification, then tyres were standardized from 1986 onwards, followed by engines and chassis in 1996. The series ran annually until 2004, and was replaced in 2005 by the GP2 Series.

Drivers in italic have entered at least one Formula One World Championship race; drivers in bold have won at least one Formula One Grand Prix.

GP2 Series 
The GP2 Series  was a form of open-wheel motor racing introduced in 2005 following the discontinuation of the long-term Formula One feeder series, Formula 3000. The GP2 format was conceived by Bernie Ecclestone and Flavio Briatore, while Ecclestone also has the rights to the name GP1. In 2010, the GP3 Series class was launched, as a feeder class for the GP2 series. In 2017, the series was rebranded as the FIA Formula 2 Championship.

Drivers in italic have raced in Formula One; drivers in bold have won at least one Formula One Grand Prix.

FIA Formula 2 Championship 
The FIA Formula 2 Championship is a second-tier single-seater racing championship organised by the Fédération Internationale de l'Automobile (FIA). The championship was introduced in 2017, following the rebranding of the long-term Formula One feeder series GP2.

Drivers in italic have raced in Formula One; drivers in bold have won at least one Formula One Grand Prix.

Indy Lights

USAC Mini-Indy Series 

 1977: Bagley and Johnson tied in the points and were declared co-champions.

Indy Lights 

1 Chaves and  Jack Harvey (Schmidt Peterson Motorsports were tied in points and wins (4 each).  Chaves won the title based on more second-place finishes (5 vs 1).

World Series by Nissan/Formula Renault 3.5/Formula V8 3.5 
The World Series Formula V8 3.5, formerly the World Series by Nissan from 1998 to 2004, the Formula Renault 3.5 Series from 2005 to 2015 and the Formula V8 3.5 in 2016 and 2017, was a motor racing series promoted by RPM Racing (1998-2004) and Renault Sport (from 2005 to 2015).

At the end of July 2015, Renault Sport announced it would be withdrawing its backing to the Formula Renault 3.5 from 2016 onwards, handing the control of the series to co-organiser RPM. However, Renault Sport also said it would continue the World Series by Renault with the Renault Sport Trophy and the Formula Renault 2.0 Eurocup. As a result of this, RPM decided to change the series' name to Formula V8 3.5. In December 2016, the series' name was changed again to World Series Formula V8 3.5, giving extra recognition to the championship. On 17 November 2017 was announced that due to lack of entries the series would not take place in 2018 with a possibility of relaunch in the near future.

World Series by Nissan

NOTE – 1998–2001, mainly Spanish-based series (also known as Formula Nissan) with 2.0L engine.
NOTE – 2002–2004, international series with V6 engine.

World Series Lights

Formula Renault 3.5 Series

World Series Formula V8 3.5

Regional and National championship 
In the same period, there have been various national and regional second-tier formula racing championships, including:

 Trophées de France (1964-1967)
 Australian Formula 2 (1964-1988)
 Tasman Series (1964-1975)
 Mexican Formula Two (1996-1997)
 British Formula 3000 (1989-1994, 1996)
 Euro Formula 3000 (1999-2014, 2016)
 GP2 Asia (2008-2011)

See also
 European Formula Two Championship
 International Formula 3000
 GP2 Series
 Formula Two Championship
 Formula 2 Championship

References

Second-tier